Kharkovchanka (Russian: Харьковчанка, "Woman of Kharkov"), code name: Manufacture 404S, is a model of Antarctic off-road vehicle made circa 1957–1958 in the Soviet Union, designed and built by the Kharkov Transport Engineering Plant, and later manufactured in Kharkiv by the Malyshev Factory. Based on the AT-T tractor platform (itself based on the T-54 tank). In December 1959 two of them ("21" and "23") were delivered to Antarctica and reached the South Pole. The massive off-road snow vehicle had a total of a small galley, toilet, oven, and eight beds.

By the 39th Russian Antarctic expedition, Vityaz DT-30Ps replaced the Kharkovchankas. Those were themselves later replaced by  300 Polar vehicles.

History

Three Kharkovchankas were built in 1958, and shipped to Antarctica. They traversed from the ocean coast to the existing Soviet Vostok Station in February 1959.  Two of these, and a third AT-T tractor, left Vostok station for the geographic South Pole in early December 1959, arriving at the pole on 26 December 1959, and surprising the US crew that had been airlifted into the Amundsen–Scott Station the previous summer.  Dozens of more exploratory missions into Antarctica were made with Kharkovchankas in subsequent years.

In 1974–1975, a second generation Kharkovchanka was designed and built for Antarctic service. The largest design difference was the movement of the cab and engine back out in front of the main massive rectangular body structure, as well as the addition of auxiliary power generation for electricity and heat when the main engine was not operating. Three second generation Karkovchankas came off the production line in the fall of 1975.

A potential third generation based on the MT-T tractor was considered in the 1980s, but was put on permanent hold for budgetary reasons, and following the Dissolution of the Soviet Union, left the Kharkovchankas as the main transportation system for Antarctic cargo into the early 2010s as part of the Russian Antarctic operation.

Description

First generation 
Like the Antarctic Snow Cruiser, the engine was inside the  living space to allow maintenance without being exposed to the elements. However, this meant that the noise of the engine prevented any sleep and that everything was covered by soot from the exhaust fumes.

Technical characteristics

First generation 
 Assembly: Kharkiv (Kharkov Transport Engineering Plant), Ukrainian SSR
 Manufacturer: Malyshev Factory
 Length: 
 Width: 
 Height: 
 Wheels: 7 each side with drive sprocket and idler
Track width: 
 Suspension: torsion bar
 Engine:  V-12 diesel
 Cruise speed: 
 Max. speed: 
 Max. grade: 30 degrees slope
 Weight: 
 Tow load: 60 tonnes

See also
 Antarctic Snow Cruiser, US vehicle, circa 1940, unsuccessful.

References

External links
Russian South Pole Traverse
Soviet automobiles
Off-road vehicles
Transport in Antarctica
Soviet Union and the Antarctic
Land vehicles with sleeping facilities